Bimekizumab, sold under the brand name Bimzelx, is a humanized anti-IL17A, anti-IL-17F, and anti-IL17AF monoclonal antibody that is used to treat plaque psoriasis.

The most common side effects include upper respiratory tract infections (nose and throat infection) and oral candidiasis (thrush, a fungal infection in the mouth or throat).

Bimekizumab was approved for medical use in the European Union in August 2021.

Medical uses 
Bimekizumab is indicated for the treatment of moderate to severe plaque psoriasis in adults who are candidates for systemic therapy.

History 
This drug is being developed by Belgian pharmaceutical company UCB. Phase III trials have demonstrated that bimekizumab is superior to not only adalimumab but also secukinumab and ustekinumab for the treatment of plaque psoriasis.

Society and culture

Names 
Bimekizumab is the international nonproprietary name (INN).

References

Further reading

External links 
 

Monoclonal antibodies